Parliamentary elections were held in Egypt in three stages between 18 October and 8 November 2000. The election was broken into stages after a July ruling by the Supreme Constitutional Court that judges must monitor all polling stations. The first stage on 18 October was held in 150 seats in northern Egypt, the second stage took place on 28 October for 134 seats in eastern and southern Egypt, and the third stage on 8 November involved the 156 seats in central Egypt, including Cairo. Two seats in Alexandria were left vacant after the results were annulled by a court.

The result was a victory for the ruling National Democratic Party (NDP), which won 353 seats. Following the election, 35 of the 72 independents also joined the NDP.

Results
Seventeen of the 72 independents were members of the Muslim Brotherhood.

References

Egypt
2000 in Egypt
Election and referendum articles with incomplete results
Elections in Egypt
October 2000 events in Africa
November 2000 events in Africa